Joseph Paul McCluskey (June 2, 1911 – August 31, 2002) was an American track and field athlete. During his running career, he won 27 national titles in various distance events and captured the steeplechase title a record nine times in a 13-year period.

Biography
At the 1932 Summer Olympics in Los Angeles, California, McCluskey won the bronze medal in the 3,000-meter steeplechase event. However, his medal could have been a silver. A substitute lap counter failed to hold up the number of the laps remaining the first time the runners went past, and the athletes wound up running an extra lap. McCluskey was second at what should have been the end of the regular race but dropped back to third during the extra lap. When offered the opportunity to rerun the race the next day, McCluskey said, "A race has only one finish line" and chose to let the results stand making it the only 3,460-meter steeplechase event ever held in Olympic history.

McCluskey, born in South Manchester, Connecticut, was also a 1936 Olympian and coached the New York Athletic Club for fourteen years. He graduated from Manchester High School in 1929. A 1933 graduate of Fordham University, McCluskey was inducted into the Fordham University Hall of Fame, the NYAC Hall of Fame, the USATF Hall of Fame in 1996 as well as the Penn Relays Wall of Fame posthumously in 2010.

He served as Lieutenant Commander in the United States Navy during World War II, then later married having eight children and employed as a stock broker in New York City.

McCluskey died in Madison, Connecticut at the age of 91. He was survived by his wife Anne Conger, and his eight children, Joseph Jr., Mary Cotard, Kathleen McElroy, James, Robert, Richard, Susan Jaeger, and Martin van Buren. He also had 12 grandchildren, with his last grandchild born in 2003. His grandchildren are Julian and Antoine Cotard, Daniel and Emily McElroy, Andrew and Richard Jr. McCluskey, Joanna and Laura Jaeger, and Gabrielle, Liam, Lucas, and Aidan McCluskey. Two of his grandchildren, Daniel McElroy and Laura Jaeger, followed in his footsteps and attended Fordham University, where Laura competed, like her grandfather, on the track and field team running the 4x400 relay race.

References

External links
 
 Joe McCluskey, "Manchester's Greatest Runner" at the Manchester Historical Society
 Joseph McCluskey at the Fordham University Athletics Hall of Fame
 
 
 

1911 births
2002 deaths
American male steeplechase runners
Olympic bronze medalists for the United States in track and field
Track and field athletes from Connecticut
Athletes (track and field) at the 1932 Summer Olympics
Athletes (track and field) at the 1936 Summer Olympics
Fordham University alumni
Sportspeople from Manchester, Connecticut
Medalists at the 1932 Summer Olympics